A52 may refer to:
 Ubiquitin A-52 residue ribosomal protein fusion product 1, a human gene

Roads 
 A52 road (England), a road connecting Newcastle-under-Lyme and Mablethorpe
 A52 motorway (France), a road connecting Aubagne and the A50
 Bundesautobahn 52, a highway in Germany usually referred to as A52
 A52 motorway (Italy), a ring road around Milan
 A52 motorway (Switzerland), a road connecting Zumikon and Hinwil
 Autovía A-52 Spain, highway connecting Benavente and O Porriño

Other 
 Samsung Galaxy A52, an Android smartphone
 The A/52 audio codec, also known as AC-3 or Dolby Digital
 One of the Encyclopaedia of Chess Openings codes for the Budapest Gambit in chess
 Action 52, a video game developed by Active Enterprises